Simona Lisi is an Italian dancer, choreographer and actress.

Biography
She successfully attend many Italian and English acting and dance academies, like the "London Contemporary Dance School". She graduated in Philosophy studying with Giorgio Agamben who deeply influenced her. In 2002 she received the PG Degree in Contemporary Dance at LCDS-University of Kent. Among her teachers there are many acclaimed dancers like Carolyn Carlson, Anne Teresa De Keersmaeker and Wim Vandekeybus. In the early 1990s Lisi begin her theatrical career as dancer and choreographer, developing her method based on contemporary dance. In 2001 her first group choreography was chosen for "X Biennal of Mediterranean and European young artists" in Sarajevo. Simona Lisi works also as an actress: in 2005 she played the mother of the leading character (played by Giovanna Mezzogiorno) in the Academy Award-nominated La bestia nel cuore (The Beast in the Heart), directed by Cristina Comencini. In 2013 she danced in  the Academy Award winning picture La grande bellezza, directed by Paolo Sorrentino.

References

External links
 Simona Lisi Official Website
 
 Simona Lisi's Curriculm
 

Year of birth missing (living people)
Living people
Italian female dancers
Italian choreographers
Italian actresses
Modern dancers
Alumni of the University of Kent